Johannes Hermanus Hendrikus "Jan" Zwartkruis (18 February 1926 – 7 March 2013) was the manager of the Netherlands national football team for two periods (1976–77, 1978–81), coaching the team in 28 matches, including the 1980 UEFA European Football Championship and 1980 Mundialito. He also coached the Trinidad and Tobago national football team for a brief moment in the 1980s  and the Netherlands Antilles during the 1994 FIFA World Cup qualification round for CONCACAF Caribbean Zone.

References

External links
  Profile

1926 births
2013 deaths
People from Overbetuwe
Dutch footballers
Association football defenders
Dutch football managers
Dutch expatriate football managers
Netherlands national football team managers
Expatriate football managers in Trinidad and Tobago
Trinidad and Tobago national football team managers
Expatriate football managers in the Netherlands Antilles
Netherlands Antilles national football team managers
UEFA Euro 1980 managers
Sportspeople from Gelderland
Dutch expatriate sportspeople in Trinidad and Tobago